Tomra or Tomrefjord is a village located in Vestnes Municipality in Møre og Romsdal county, Norway. It is located just south of the village of Vik at the end of the Tomrefjorden.

Businessman Bjørn Rune Gjelsten is from Tomrefjord, and footballer Kjetil Rekdal went to school there.  Also situated in Tomrefjord is the shipyard VARD Langsten, which is the quintessential cornerstone of the community.

References

Vestnes
Villages in Møre og Romsdal